Lake Lehman Junior Senior High School is a public school in Lehman Township, Luzerne County, Pennsylvania, United States that was established by the merger of a Middle Level Educational Building, which provided an education from grades seven to eight, and a high school, which did the same for grades nine to twelve. The two schools were combined in 2003 and it is located in a rural setting.

Most classes consist of 30 or fewer students. Basic classes are offered for everyone, but the school also offers advanced courses, and Advanced Placement classes for college preparation.

Activities
The school has many students in the National Honor Society and the National Junior Honor Society. Many students also participate in the National History Day Program, Science Olympiad, and JETS academic contests.  Clubs include a community-service-based group, called Key Club, and a Seinfeld Club.  Organizations such as Peer Helpers are composed of students who are role-model material and go through training in order to help peers in the school with problems.

Lake-Lehman's wrestling team has won numerous PIAA District 2 championships, 3 PIAA Northeast Regional Championships and a PIAA State Championship.  Lake-Lehman has crowned 5 individual PIAA state wrestling champions (as recently as 2007) as well as numerous state medalists.
The Girls field hockey team has won numerous PIAA District 2 championships and 2 PIAA State Championships.
Lake-Lehman boys volleyball teams have won 22 Wyoming Valley Conference titles and 19 PIAA District 2 championships.
Lake-Lehman has 5 state champions in Track and Field. The school has also crowned 2 PIAA Cross Country State Champions

The senior class raises money through sales of nutritional food during refreshment break.  The senior trip to Washington D.C. is held in the spring. The class visits many monuments and buildings including the Smithsonian, the White House, Mt. Vernon, and the Arlington National Cemetery.

Recent history
 Major hazing incident in September 2003 
 Episode of MTV's Made featuring Angie Nice filmed and aired nationally in the fall of 2003.  In this episode, Angie wanted to overcome her stage fright and become involved in the school play.
 16-year-old junior Justine Martin was killed in an automobile accident on January 30, 2008.

Notable alumni
 Rick Bonomo - 3 Time NCAA D1 Wrestling Champ at Bloomsburg University 
 Raye Hollitt - Actress, female bodybuilder, and a former American Gladiator cast member.
 Brian Kelly - Former Professional Soccer Player 
 
 Jay McCarroll - Fashion designer who won the reality show Project Runway in 2005
 Connor McGovern, NFL player
 Patrick McGrath - Hockey player in the Pittsburgh Penguins' minor-league organization (Wilkes-Barre/Scranton Penguins, Wheeling Nailers); played briefly in the QMJHL with the PEI Rocket.

References

External links
 

Public middle schools in Pennsylvania
Public high schools in Pennsylvania
Educational institutions established in 2003
Schools in Luzerne County, Pennsylvania
2003 establishments in Pennsylvania